Karsten Kiilerich (21 January 1955, Slagelse) is a Danish film and television director, screenwriter and animator. He is a co-founder of the Danish animation studio A. Film Production, for which he still actively works. Kiilerich has been involved in over 20 feature and short films.

Kiilerich's animated short When Life Departs (1997) was nominated for several awards, including the Academy Award for Best Animated Short Film. He was also nominated for the Robert Award for Best Screenplay for Help! I'm a Fish (2001).

Biography 
Killerich was born in the town of Slagelse, Zealand on 21 January 1955. He initially worked as a school teacher.

Film career 
He began his career in 1986 when he worked as an assistant animator for the film Valhalla. On 1 August 1988, Kiilerich co-founded the Danish animation studio A. Film Production alongside Stefan Fjeldmark, Jørgen Lerdan, Hans Perk and Anders Mastrup, and they continue to work closely with each other. He worked as an animator and created several of his own short films throughout the 1990s and early 2000s. His feature film debut was The Ugly Duckling and Me!, released in 2006.

Filmography

See also 
Hans Perk–co-founder of A. Film Production, frequent collaborator

References

External links 

1955 births
Living people
Danish animators
Danish film directors
Danish male screenwriters
People from Slagelse